Jinsha Township (Kinsha) is an urban township in the north-eastern corner of Greater Kinmen Island (Quemoy), Kinmen County, Fujian Province, Republic of China (Taiwan). It is in the Taiwan Strait, on the coast of mainland China.

Geography

The township is the second largest by area of the six townships of Kinmen County. The township includes Cao Islet (Ts'ao Hsü), Hou Islet, and other small islets.

Rock-filled waters make passage between the two areas difficult.

Politics and government

Administrative divisions
Jinsha Township is divided into eight urban villages:
 Dayang Village
 Hodo / Hedou Village
 Kuanchien / Guangqian Village
 Guanyu Village, northernmost village; includes Cao Islet (Ts'ao Hsü), Hou Islet, and other small islets
 Pushan Village
 Sanshan Village
 Wensha Village
 Siyuan / Xiyuan Village (Hsi-yüan)

Mayors
After World War II, mayors of the Jinsha Township were:
Mayors (urban township)
 Chang Hsi-Hu (1945)
 Huang Ko-Tsun (1946)
 Lin Yen-Chueh (1946–1947)
 Chang Jung-Chiang (1947–1949)
Mayors (rural township)
 Chang Jung-Chiang (1949)
 Chang Hsi-Hu (1949)
Mayors (districts)
District 1: Chang Jung-Chiang (1949–1950)
District 2: Wang Tien-Chu (1949), Chang Hsi-Hu (1949–1950)
Unified district: Chang Jung-Chiang (1950–1953)

Since 1953, the Jinsha Township has been led by a mayor (urban township).
 Chang Jung-Chiang (1953–1954)
 Wu Shui-Chih (1954–1955)
 Teng Chen-Kang (1955–1958), also mayor of Jinhu, Kinmen
 Hsieh Shui-I (1958–1960)
 Yeh Te-Hui (1960–1963)
 Chang Ying (1963–1965)
 Chang Li-Min (1965–1966)
 Fu Wen-Min (1967–1971)
 Huang Sheng-Chien (1971–1975)
 Chang Chun-Chuan (1975–1986)
 Chen Chia-Chieh (1986–1994)
 Huang Ching-Lan (1994–2002)
 Huang I-Hsin (2002–2006)
 Chen Kun-Ti (2006–2014)
 Chen Chi-Te (2014–2016)
 Wang Teng-Wei (2016)
 Chen Chi-Te (2016)
 Wang Teng-Wei (2016–2017)
 Yang Chih-Pin (2017)
 Tsai Chi-Chao (2017–2018)
 Wu Yu-Chia (2018–present)

Education
 Kinmen Campus of Ming Chuan University

Infrastructure
 Shanxi Reservoir
 Tianpu Reservoir

Tourist attractions
 Jindong Movie Theater
 Longfeng Temple
 Kinmen Folk Culture Village
 Mashan Broadcasting and Observation Station
 Wang Chin-cheng's Western House

See also
 List of islands of Taiwan

References

Further reading
 Yang Tien-Hou & Lin Li-Kuan ed., (2018). .

External links

  Jinsha Provincial Government website
金門縣金沙鎮公所.中天電視【台灣新亮點】 ('Jinsha Township Office, Kinmen. Chung T'ien Television Taiwan's New Highlights')